Pangua Canton is a canton of Ecuador, located in the Cotopaxi Province.  Its capital is the town of El Corazón.  Its population at the 2001 census was 19,877.

Demographics
Ethnic groups as of the Ecuadorian census of 2010:
Mestizo  76.8%
Indigenous  10.0%
Montubio  8.8%
White  2.8%
Afro-Ecuadorian  1.5%
Other  0.1%

References

Cantons of Cotopaxi Province